The Quaker City Hockey Club was an amateur ice hockey team from Philadelphia, Pennsylvania. The Quaker City Hockey Club formed in 1897 and played in the American Amateur Hockey League during the 1900–01 season, playing its home games at the West Park Ice Palace at 52nd and Jefferson streets in Philadelphia, before the Ice Palace was destroyed in a fire on March 24 1901.

The team finished last in the 1900–01 AAHL standings (behind Brooklyn Crescents, New York Athletic Club, St. Nicholas Hockey Club, Brooklyn Skating Club and New York Hockey Club) with two wins, eight losses and one draw.

Canadian middle distance runner and Olympic gold medalist George Orton captained the team. Also on the 1900–01 roster was Pennsylvania native 1906 US Open tennis champion William Clothier. The 1897–98 season saw Canadians Hugh Yelverton "Bert" Russel (of the Ottawa Hockey Club) and Stanley Willett (of the Montreal Victorias) on the roster.

References

Notes

Defunct ice hockey teams in the United States
Sports in Philadelphia
Ice hockey clubs established in 1897
1897 establishments in Pennsylvania